Danny Bittencourt Morais or simply Danny Morais  (born June 29, 1985 in Porto Alegre) is a former Brazilian footballer who played by last for Santa Cruz.

Career
Morais has been an able replacement for injured Uruguayan central defender Gonzalo Sorondo who is currently out for six months from November 2007, with a knee injury. On 13 February 2010 Botafogo de Futebol e Regatas announce the signing of the center back, the player arrives on loan until the end of December from Internacional. They continue also to track the player of Palmeiras Sandro Silva.

Honours
Internacional
Campeonato Gaúcho: 2008, 2009
Dubai Cup: 2008
Copa Sudamericana: 2008
Suruga Bank Championship: 2009

Botafogo
Campeonato Carioca: 2010

Bahia
Campeonato Baiano: 2012

Santa Cruz
Campeonato Pernambucano: 2015, 2016
Copa do Nordeste: 2016

References

External links

internacional.com 

1985 births
Living people
Brazilian footballers
Association football defenders
Brazilian expatriate footballers
Sport Club Internacional players
Botafogo de Futebol e Regatas players
Esporte Clube Bahia players
Ettifaq FC players
Associação Chapecoense de Futebol players
Campeonato Brasileiro Série A players
Brazilian people of German descent
Expatriate footballers in Saudi Arabia
Busan IPark players
K League 2 players
Expatriate footballers in South Korea
Brazilian expatriate sportspeople in South Korea
Saudi Professional League players
Footballers from Porto Alegre